is a vehicular combat racing video game developed by Givro Corporation (previously Almanic Corp.) and published by Tsukuda Original in Japan exclusively for the Super Famicom on 4 March 1995. Centered around a series of road races throughout various locations, the player must win to advance in higher-difficulty races while using attacks to hinder other racers. Directed by Nanako Geya, the game was created by most of the same team that worked on previous projects at Givro such as River City Girls Zero, initially intended to be published by Technōs Japan under a different title before release.

Gameplay 

Super Mad Champ is a vehicular combar racing game reminiscent of Road Rash, putting players in control of a motorcycle racer who must finish in either third-place or higher among five racers through three grand prix; GP2, GP1 and Super, with each race taking place in a number of locations. There are also a time attack option, a password feature and an option screen to configure various settings such as controls and sound.

During a race, players can brake, accelerate, and attack the nearest neighboring racers. The player's character can be ejected from their bike if they crash into an obstacle or if they run out of stamina due to fights with other racers. Both the human player and the computer opponents have a damage bar for both the person and the vehicle. Vehicle speeds for unmodified "stock" motorcycles can easily reach the  range.

Development and release 
Super Mad Champ was created by most of the same team that worked on previous projects at Givro Corporation (previously Almanic Corp.) such as Shin Nekketsu Kōha: Kunio-tachi no Banka, with Nanako Geya acting as the project's director. Artists "Duke" Ishikawa, "Ryukun King!!" and Nao Yuki were responsible for character designs, while Toshiaki Fujioka and Yasuo Wakatsuki created the pixel art. Hiroko Yamabiko, "Shiochi" and "Sorimachin" served as programmers, while composer Hikoshi Hashimoto scored the soundtrack and created the sound effects. A member under the pseudonym of "Kishi" collaborated as the game's sole designer. Producers Noriyuki Tomiyama, Takeshi Wakui and Yukio Tomita oversaw its development process. Other members also collaborated in its making. 

Super Mad Champ was released only in Japan by Tsukada Original on 4 March 1995. Prior to launch, it was originally intended to be published by Technōs Japan and had the working title of Mad Champ 2088.

Reception

Notes

References

External links 
 Super Mad Champ at GameFAQs

1995 video games
Givro Corporation games
Japan-exclusive video games
Motorcycle video games
Racing video games
Super Nintendo Entertainment System games
Super Nintendo Entertainment System-only games
Tsukuda Original games
Video games developed in Japan